Cathal Muckian (born 30 November 1951 in Dundalk), a native of Dundalk, County Louth; had a career in League of Ireland football during the 1970s and early 80s. Muckian played for five clubs, notably Drogheda United and Dundalk FC. In 1978, he was called into the Republic of Ireland national team by John Giles for an international friendly against Poland and won his first and only full international cap.

In 1980/81 season he played for Shamrock Rovers F.C. and Shelbourne F.C. The following season, he turned out for Athlone Town F.C.

Honours

Dundalk
League of Ireland: 1
 1978/79
FAI Cup: 2
 1977, 1979
League of Ireland Cup: 1
 1978
Leinster Senior Cup: 2
 1976/77, 1977/78
President's Cup: 1
 1979/80

References

External links

Drogheda United F.C. players
Dundalk F.C. players
Shamrock Rovers F.C. players
Shelbourne F.C. players
Athlone Town A.F.C. players
League of Ireland players
League of Ireland XI players
Republic of Ireland international footballers
Republic of Ireland association footballers
People from Dundalk
Living people
1951 births
Association footballers from County Louth
Association football forwards